Choke pear may refer to:

 Choke pear (plant), any variety of astringent pear fruit
 Pear of anguish, a device found in some museums